Thureau-Dangin is a French surname. Notable people with the surname include:

 François Thureau-Dangin (1872 – 1944) was a French archaeologist, assyriologist, and epigrapher who played a major role in the deciphering of Sumerian and Akkadian languages
 Paul Thureau-Dangin (1837–1913), French historian of the reign of Louis-Philippe and the revival of Catholic thought in 19th century Britain

See also
 Dangin (disambiguation)

French-language surnames
Compound surnames